Maxminio Montresor or Maxminio Montrezol (born 3 March 1980) is a Brazilian footballer who plays as a goalkeeper.

Career
He has previously played for Olaria, Cuiabá Esporte Clube, Treviso and Martina.

In 2006, he traveled to Italy as Maxminio Montresor with DOB on 4 March, but in Brazil his DOB on official document on 3 March as Montrezol.

In 2009, he returned to Mato Grosso for Palmeiras (MT), then in October 2009 for Operário (MT) for 2010 Campeonato Matogrossense.

References

External links

1980 births
Living people
People from Cuiabá
Brazilian footballers
Brazilian expatriate footballers
Serie B players
Treviso F.B.C. 1993 players
Association football goalkeepers
Expatriate footballers in Italy
A.S.D. Martina Calcio 1947 players
Operário Futebol Clube (Várzea Grande) players
Sportspeople from Mato Grosso